Puran Bhaat is a puppeteer from India. Originally from Rajasthan, his  group of puppeteer families settled in Delhi almost fifty years ago. They currently reside in the Kathputli Colony at Delhi, an artist community.

He was awarded the Sangeet Natak Akademi Award in 2003, given by the Sangeet Natak Akademi, India's National Academy of Music, Dance & Drama.

Bhaat was one of the primary subjects of the 2014 docudrama Tomorrow We Disappear, which revolves around the Kathputli Colony facing impending eviction in order to build high-rise housing on the outskirts of New Delhi.

See also
 Kathputli (Puppet)

References

External links 

 Entry on PuppetIndia referencing Puran Bhatt 

People from Rajasthan
Rajasthani people
Recipients of the Sangeet Natak Akademi Award
Indian puppeteers
Living people
Year of birth missing (living people)